The Brighton Cougars are an English basketball club from the city of Brighton.  The Cougars play at Dorothy Stringer School and attract a broad-based membership of boys and girls from five years old through to adult men and women.

History

Established in 1989, the club was founded to offer sessions to develop and improve basketball skills and techniques within the local community, and entered senior teams to compete in the local Sussex League and junior teams in local age-group leagues.  Ten years after their founding, the club made a move into the National League, where they competed for five seasons from 1999 to 2004.  Despite some strong performances and two appearances in the playoffs, the club never made it beyond the lower reaches of the league, and financial concerns led the club to drop out of national competition after the 2003-2004 season, returning to the local Sussex League.

The club came to wider prominence when they applied to join the professional British Basketball League in 2007. The club aimed to compete in Britain's top-tier league in the 2008-09 season, and would have occupied the spot vacated by Brighton's former professional basketball franchise the Brighton Bears, which folded in 2006. However the application was turned down in favour of Worthing Thunder, a local rival team.  After their unsuccessful application, the Cougars made a brief return to the National League, but dropped out of Division Four Midlands South after a single disappointing season saw them finish second-from-bottom.

The Cougars returned once again to the Sussex League for several years, building their fanbase and their reach within the community.  In 2014, the decision was taken to re-launch the National League team, in order to offer junior players a further outlet to progress.  An application was made and accepted to join the English Basketball League in the 2014-15 season, which led to the club being awarded a place in Division 4 (South East).  The team's first season back in the league ended in a respectable 5th place finish, finishing only two wins short of a place in the playoffs.

Season-by-season records

See also
 Brighton Bears
 British Basketball League

References

External links
 Brighton Cougars website

Basketball teams in England